Nyaya Tharasu is a 1989 Indian Tamil-language film, directed by K. Rajeshwar, making his directorial debut, starring Nizhalgal Ravi and Radha. It is a remake of Malayalam film Panchagni. The film revolves around a woman who puts her commitment to social activism above everything else, including her own love for an adoring man.

Plot 
The movie revolves around the incidents in a two-week period, when Bharathi (Radha), a Naxal activist is out in parole. She is serving life sentence in the central jail, Kannore after being charged for the murder of Paramanandham (Vijayan), a landlord, who she had seen kill a young tribal woman after she was raped and impregnated by him.

Bharathi's mother, a past freedom fighter who is on her deathbed, is relieved to see her, and is under the impression that she is free now. Her younger sister Savithri, her husband Vijayasarathi and her nephew are happy to have her back home. But her younger brother, Bose (Charle), an unemployed guy, addicted to drugs is angered by her mere presence, blaming her for his inability to secure a good job. Bharathi's older brother who is home from Delhi to perform the death rites of her mother refuses to even talk to her, and leaves after a big brouhaha, leaving his nephew to do the rites. Most of her acquaintances are intimidated by her, except her old classmate Amutha (Kutty Padmini). Amudha had married her college sweetheart, Nagappan (Livingston) and lives close to Bharathi's home.

Thazhamuthu (Nizhalgal Ravi), a Nyaya Tharasu journalist, tries to get an interview with Bharathi, she declines initially and is annoyed by his persistence.

As the days pass, Bharathi feels unwanted, and ends up having no place to live. Savithri suspects an affair between her husband and Bharathi, making it hard for Bharathi to stay with them. Amutha's husband had changed a lot in years, had degraded into a womanizer, and Bharathi can't stay with them either. Ultimately Bharathi, asks Thazhamuthu for help and ends up staying at his place.

With time, Bharathi and Thazhamuthu get closer, and a lovely relationship blossoms between the two. As Bharathi is nearing the completion of her parole, Thazhamuthu, with great difficulty, succeeds in getting the government remission order in time, so that Bharathi no longer has to go back to jail. By this time Savithri and Bose reconcile with Bharathi, and are overjoyed to hear about her release. Bharathi rushes to Amutha's place to share the good news, but there she is shocked to see Amutha, being gang-raped by her husband Nagappan and friends. True to her righteous self, Bharathi ends up shooting Nagappan with his hunting rifle and ultimately surrenders herself at the police station.

Cast 
Nizhalgal Ravi as Thazhamuthu
Radha[voice artist: actress sripriya] as Bharathi
Ra. Sankaran
Vijayan as landlord Paramanandham
Nassar as Advocate Singara Sithan
Charle as Bose
Livingston as Nagappan
M. K. Muthu as Puratchi Mani in a special appearance
Kutty Padmini as Amutha
Disco Shanti
 Vani as Bhavani Ammal
 Priya Balakrishnan as Sarojini (Radha's younger sister)

Production 
The film marked the directorial debut of K. Rajeshwar, who earlier scripted for films like Panneer Pushpangal (1981), Kadalora Kavithaigal (1986) and Solla Thudikuthu Manasu (1988). The film was a remake of the Malayalam film Panchagni and had a screenplay written by M. Karunanidhi. A. L. Azhagappan co-produced the film.

Soundtrack 
The soundtrack was composed by Shankar–Ganesh. All lyrics were penned by Vairamuthu.

Reception 
P. S. S. of Kalki lauded the film's cinematography but felt the stunt sequences would dismay fans. Nyaya Tharasu won the Tamil Nadu State Film Award for Third Best Film.

References

External links 
Nyaya Tharasu on YouTube

1989 films
Tamil remakes of Malayalam films
1989 directorial debut films
Films scored by Shankar–Ganesh
1980s Tamil-language films
Films with screenplays by M. Karunanidhi
Films about Naxalism
Indian feminist films
Films about women in India
Films about rape
Films directed by K. Rajeshwar